The 39th Battalion, CEF, was an infantry battalion of the Canadian Expeditionary Force during the Great War.

History 
The 39th Battalion was authorized on 7 November 1914 and embarked for Great Britain on 17 June 1915. It provided reinforcements to the Canadian Corps in the field until 4 January 1917, when its personnel were absorbed by the 6th Reserve Battalion, CEF. The battalion was subsequently disbanded on 17 July 1917.

The 39th Battalion recruited in Eastern Ontario was mobilized at Belleville, Ontario.

The 39th battalion had one Officer Commanding, Lt-Col. A.V. Preston from 24 June 1915 to 4 January 1917.

The 39th Battalion was awarded the battle honour THE GREAT WAR 1915-17.

Perpetuation 
The 39th Battalion CEF is perpetuated by The Hastings and Prince Edward Regiment.

See also 

 List of infantry battalions in the Canadian Expeditionary Force

References

Sources
Canadian Expeditionary Force 1914-1919 by Col. G.W.L. Nicholson, CD, Queen's Printer, Ottawa, Ontario, 1962

External links

039
Military units and formations of Ontario
Hastings and Prince Edward Regiment
Midland Regiment